Little Sandy River may refer to:

Little Sandy River (Kentucky), a tributary of the Ohio River
Little Sandy River (Oregon), a tributary of the Bull Run River
Little Sandy River (South Carolina), a tributary of the Broad River

See also
 Big Sandy River (disambiguation)
 Sandy River (disambiguation)